Sir William Samwell (1559–1628) of Northampton and Upton was an Auditor of the Exchequer to Queen Elizabeth I of England.  He was knighted at the coronation of King James I of England in 1603.

His nephew was James Harrington (1611–1677), English political philosopher, best known for his controversial work, Oceana.

His grandson was William Samwell (1628–1676), English architect.

The Samwell baronets were created for his great-grandson Sir Thomas Samwell, 1st Baronet.

References

1559 births
1628 deaths
16th-century English people
17th-century English people
People from Northampton
People from Upton, Northamptonshire